Scipio A. Jones High School was a public high school for black students in North Little Rock, Arkansas. It was named after Scipio Africanus Jones.

History
It originated as the Argenta Colored School, which began operations in 1909. Around 1911 it became the Hickory Street High School. The school developed into a full K-12 school by 1917, and it received its final name in 1928.

In 1958-1959 the Little Rock School District temporarily closed all of its schools, but Scipio Jones was only able to accept a few black students who were locked out of their previous schools; the school district required that any student wishing to transfer to have an address in North Little Rock at the time.

Scipio Jones High closed in 1970. Students were redirected to North Little Rock High School.

 the gymnasium is the only structure left standing as the main school building was destroyed in a fire shortly after its closure.

References

External links
 Scipio A. Jones National Alumni Association

High schools in North Little Rock, Arkansas
1928 establishments in Arkansas
1970 disestablishments in Arkansas
Historically segregated African-American schools in Arkansas
Educational institutions established in 1928
Educational institutions disestablished in 1970
Defunct schools in Arkansas